A platform ticket is a type of rail ticket issued by some railway systems, permitting the bearer to access the platforms of a railway station, but not to board and use any train services. It allows non-passengers to enter the paid area of the station, for example to walk with their friends, associates and loved ones all the way to the passenger car at stations where the general public is not admitted to platforms. Trainspotters can also purchase platform tickets and enjoy their trainspotting hobbies. They vary in type: some may only allow limited access and a sharply limited time of usage, while others may have totally free access to enter the platform area. During peak usage hours or rush hours, the platforms may only be available for passengers who intend to travel.

History
Platform tickets emerged in the 19th century. At that time passenger coaches had no internal corridor, as they have today. In order to inspect tickets, conductors had to move along the outside of the train while it was in motion. Although trains moved much slower than today, there were numerous accidents. Therefore, railway operators began to check the tickets on the platform before passengers boarded the train. Passing these checkpoints required either a ticket for travel or the platform ticket, which was only valid for access to the platform. After railcars were changed, people and conductors could move from carriage to carriage so checking the tickets outside the train was no longer necessary. Most railway transport systems abolished this in the second half of the 20th century. As soon as there were no more checks, the platform ticket was unnecessary and generally was abandoned. However, as there are now automated ticket barriers, railfans and trainspotters buy these tickets to get past the barriers and onto the platform.

Usage by country

China

China Railways ceased to issue platform tickets from 2014. At some major stations like Beijing West railway station, a person can still escort a passenger in need by applying for a permit with the escorter's ID card.

Germany
In Germany the Royal Prussian Railway was the first carrier to introduce ticket checks outside the trains in 1893. Other railways in Germany soon followed. Platform checks and tickets were done away with in East Germany in 1970 and in West Germany in 1974. In some local transportation networks, they lasted longer; the last one in which they still apply is public transportation in Hamburg, where platform tickets must be bought to access the platforms without a travel ticket. The price is 0.10 euros.

India

A platform ticket for any railway station situated across India costs not more than ₹10 and is valid for not more than two hours. Tickets are issued from either ticketing counters and ATVMs on the railway station, or from Indian Railways' UTS app. If a passenger is caught by railway ticket checking staff at any platform without platform ticket or travelling ticket, passenger will be charged double the fare of the last train that arrived at / departed from that platform. The fare will be worked out on the basis of the last ticket checking station on the train's route.

Japan
They do not allow holders to board trains. All staffed stations of JR East, JR Central and JR West, and stations of JR Hokkaido with automatic ticket gates limit the validity of the ticket to two hours from issuance; an additional fee is charged if the ticket holder exits the ticket gate after the two-hour period expires.

Taiwan
The Taiwan Railways Administration stopped selling platform tickets (月臺票/月台票) on 1 June 2013 to lend platform access certificate (月台出入證) on holding pictured identification documents.
Zhongli, Taichung, Chiayi, Tainan, Kaohsiung, Hualien and Yilan stations from the north, counterclockwise, would continue to sell platform tickets in addition to lending platform access passes.
A platform ticket or a platform access certificate allows staying in the paid area of a station for up to one hour. Staying longer requires the fare of starting mileage of Fu-Hsing Semi-Express and other train in the same level.
An electronic ticket used to enter and exit the same station is charged NT$14 within one hour, NT$112 within three hours, or NT$843 beyond 3 hours.

United Kingdom

Platform tickets were in common use on the mainline network until the mid 20th century, and the majority of ticket offices are still equipped to issue them. The use of automated ticket barriers at stations has resulted in a renewed demand for platform tickets. Railfans, in particular, are told that they may require a platform ticket for access to platforms, but some individuals have cited difficulty in obtaining them. They are valid for one hour and cost £0.10; the last price increase was in January 1988.

Some heritage railways and museums issue platform tickets for admittance or as souvenirs.

United States
While not a platform ticket per se, Bay Area Rapid Transit charges a specialty excursion fare for entering and exiting the system within three hours at the same station.

References 

Railway stations
Tickets